The Gosaukamm is an Austrian mountain chain within the Dachstein range of the Northern Limestone Alps. Although relatively short in length, the chain forms an imposing backdrop to the valley and town of Gosau.

Geography 
The main ridge of the Gosaukamm forms the border between the Austrian states of Salzburg and Upper Austria. Part of the Dachstein Massif; it is located northwest of the Hoher Dachstein summit and forms part of the UNESCO World Heritage Site Hallstatt-Dachstein/Salzkammergut Cultural Landscape The Vorderer Gosausee lies along the northern side on its base.

Notable Peaks 
Moving along the ridge from northwest in the southeastern direction, some of the notable peaks are:

 Kleiner Donnerkogel
 Großer Donnerkogel
 Steinriesenkogel
 Strichkogel
 Angerstein
 Mandlkogel
 Wasserkarkogel
 Sternkogel
 Großwand
 Däumling
 Armkarwand
 Stuhllochspitze
 Große Bischofsmütze
 Kleine Bischofsmütze
 Kamplbrunnspitze

See also 

Eastern Alps
Limestone Alps

References

External links 

Mountains of Austria